William atte Dene (fl. 1368–1395), of Wycombe, Buckinghamshire, was an English politician.

He was a Member (MP) of the Parliament of England for Wycombe in 1368, 1369, 1371, 1372, 1373, 1376, January 1377, October 1377, 1378, January 1380, October 1382, February 1383, November 1384, September 1388, January 1390, 1391, 1394 and 1395. He was Mayor of Wycombe in 1365–6 and 1370–1.

References

Year of birth missing
Mayors of places in Buckinghamshire
Year of death missing
English MPs 1368
English MPs 1369
English MPs 1371
English MPs 1372
English MPs 1373
English MPs 1376
English MPs January 1377
English MPs October 1377
English MPs 1378
English MPs January 1380
English MPs October 1382
English MPs February 1383
English MPs November 1384
English MPs September 1388
English MPs January 1390
English MPs 1391
English MPs 1394
English MPs 1395